Nzam is a town in Anambra West Local Government Area of Anambra State, Nigeria. The town has boundaries in the North with Inoma Akator; in the east with Mmiata Anam; in the west with the River Niger; and in the south with Umuenwelum Anam.

Starting from Otuocha one crosses Anambra River to Umueze Anam, going through Mmiata to Nzam or through Oroma-Etiti Anam via Umuenwelum to Nzam. The town is about sixteen Kilometers to Otuocha on the East, twenty-five kilometers to Onitsha on the south and six kilometers to the boundary of Kogi State and Anambra state.

Nzam, is constituted by eight villages; namely Etakolo, Odobo, Enekpa, Echa, Opkoliba, Urubi, Igeja, Uda. The area of the town is riverine, most of the inhabitants are farmers and fishermen. They produce yam, cassava, maize and rice in abundance yearly.

History

Nzam is a unique Igbo town. Unique in so many ways. For instance they are a bilingual people. Every Nzam person apart from speaking Igbo as their mother tongue, also spoke Igala, the language of the ethnic Igalas bordering Igboland in the North. This has to do with the movement and settlement of people from that area hundreds of years ago.

In the past Niger River was the main trading route between communities along its coast, it also facilitated migration and settlement. It may not be impossible therefore that the Nzam people or a part of them migrated from Igala. But the more common explanation by the people of Nzam regarding their bilingualism was that Nzam mastered Igala language as a trade strategy. Nzam was an important trade post during the boom days of the Niger River trade route. Being located upper north, it was one of the first large Igbo communities the Igala traders arrive in. Through such regular contacts, they learnt their language. When other Igbo traders come in from the hinterland, the Nzam trader becomes the go between, the middlemen. Because of his mastery of both languages the Nzam people were able to make good bargains to their advantage

Origin
The Igbo people of Nzam are said to be descendants of aboriginal Igbos, as well as those from neighboring communities.

History also has it that the land in which the town was located was initially occupied by other aboriginal Igbos, whom migrant Igbos grew to outnumber. Some later re-emerged to join other native Igbos to repossess the town.

The town's new monarch is Igwe John Nwachukwu Ogugua (IDE Nzam) following the death of Igwe Paul Okolo in 2012. Igwe John Nwachukwu Ogugua was elected as the Igwe on 10 May 2016 after a 3-year period as the customs and tradition demands. He was officially presented with a certificate of recognition by the governor of Anambra State Chief Willie Obiano on 16 September 2016 at the State capital Awka.

References

Populated places in Anambra State